Erigeron howellii  is a rare North American species of flowering plant in the family Asteraceae known as Howell's fleabane. It has been found in the Cascades in the northwestern United States, in northwestern Oregon and southwestern Washington.

Erigeron howellii  is a perennial herb up to 50 centimeters (20 inches) tall, spreading by means of underground rhizomes. Each plant generally produces only one flower head, with up to 50 white ray florets surrounding numerous yellow disc florets.

References

howellii
Flora of Oregon
Plants described in 1880
Flora of Washington (state)
Flora without expected TNC conservation status